Coolie is a 1983 Indian action comedy film, directed by Manmohan Desai and written by Kader Khan. The film stars Amitabh Bachchan as Iqbal Aslam Khan, a railway coolie, with supporting roles played by Rishi Kapoor, Rati Agnihotri, Shoma Anand, Kader Khan, Waheeda Rehman, Suresh Oberoi and Puneet Issar. It was highest-grossing film of the year.

The film is infamous for a fight scene with co-star Puneet Issar, during which Amitabh Bachchan had a near-fatal injury due to a miscalculated jump.

Plot 
A wealthy, but evil man named Zafar Khan, has fallen in love with a girl named Salma and wants to marry her, but she and her father did not let him. Zafar was arrested for various crimes and was imprisoned for 10 years, but when he is released, he sees that Salma is married to a good man named Aslam Khan. Zafar Khan wants to convince Salma to marry him but Salma refuses. Zafar murders Salma's father and plots his revenge by flooding the region in which Salma lives, nearly killing Aslam and injuring Salma, causing her to lose her memory. During this catastrophe, Salma is also separated from her young son Iqbal. On a railway platform, Iqbal attempts to go after her on foot while Salma is on a train, but he slips and the train leaves the platform. Zafar abducts Salma and tells the world she is his wife. He also adopts an infant from an orphanage in Kanpur, a boy named Sunny, for Salma to raise on the advice of a psychiatrist. Meanwhile, Iqbal is reunited with his uncle, who has lost his wife and son in the flood. In the process of a heated fight, Iqbal's uncle has lost his right arm, to which Iqbal tells him he will serve as his uncle's right arm from the present onward. The uncle will raise Iqbal as his own, as they have no more family.

Years pass, and Iqbal and his uncle work as coolies. Iqbal has grown up to be a dashing, confident young man, and is considered the leader of the local coolies. During an incident with a man named Mr. Puri, a coolie is beaten up badly, to which Iqbal is infuriated. Mr. Puri is beaten up, but Iqbal is wrongfully imprisoned for his actions. On the same day, however, he is set free. He organizes a labor strike, which brings the station to its knees. Sunny, a young, budding reporter, is covering the story. While speaking to Sunny, Iqbal sees a picture of Sunny's mother who turns out to be Salma. In another attempt to get Salma back, Iqbal rushes to her house to bring her back after all these years, but, to his horror, Salma does not recognize him. Zafar is infuriated at Iqbal's trespass. His crooks, disguised as police officers, near-fatally beat Iqbal, while he takes Salma to the psychiatrist to administer electric shocks on her so that her memory never returns. Sunny threatens to publish all of Zafar's crimes in the newspapers the following day if he does not return Salma to him.

Iqbal and Sunny become friends, and both find love; Iqbal with a Christian girl Julie D'Costa and Sunny with his childhood sweetheart, Deepa. Meanwhile, Aslam has been imprisoned for a crime he did not commit. When he is finally let out, Julie tries to kill him in a graveyard because she thought he had murdered her father, John D'Costa, but, as the revolver is empty, she cannot fire. Aslam explains that Zafar had murdered her father, and framed Aslam, to which Julie believes him. Things are looking up, but the coolies uncover a banking and housing scandal against them. After a series of run-ins with the corrupt parties, Iqbal finds himself in a fight to the death with Zafar. Salma returns at a very pivotal scene in the film, during the election standoff between the communist workers under Iqbal and the capitalist lords under Zafar with her old memories intact and she publicly testifies against Zafar and how he destroyed her family. In the crowd is an old man, who turns out to be Iqbal's long-lost father Aslam. Also, Iqbal's uncle recognizes a birthmark on Sunny, proving that Sunny was indeed the son he thought he had lost in the great flood. The family is reunited, much to the fury of Zafar, who then proceeds to shoot Aslam but accidentally shoots and kills Iqbal's beloved mamu (maternal uncle) who cared for him in his youth. Zafar then abducts Salma. Iqbal and Sunny both chase after the evildoers, killing Mr. Puri (who dies from a heart attack due to the mental pressure of the chase) and Vicky (who falls out of Zafar's car and is run over by an oncoming truck) in the process, until Iqbal corners Zafar in a masjid. The holy shroud from the dargah shrine flies onto Iqbal's chest, and Iqbal defiantly faces Zafar with the belief in God's protection from harm with His name on his chest. He is shot several times by Zafar, but he continues to chase Zafar up the minaret, saying a part of the shahada with each shot. With the last of his strength, he cries the takbir and pushes Zafar off the parapet, killing him instantly, and Iqbal collapses into his mother's arms. Coolies from all faiths pray hard for his recovery, and Iqbal recovers from his injuries to the joy of all.

Cast 
 Amitabh Bachchan as Iqbal Khan / Lambuji
 Rishi Kapoor as Sunny Khan / Tinguji 
 Rati Agnihotri as Julie D' Costa  
 Shoma Anand as Deepa Iyengar
 Kader Khan as Zafar Khan
 Waheeda Rehman as Salma Khan
 Puneet Issar as Bob
 Satyendra Kapoor as Aslam Khan (Iqbal's Father)
 Suresh Oberoi as Vicky Puri
 Om Shivpuri as Om Puri
 Nilu Phule as Nathu
 Mukri as Deepa's Father
 Tun Tun as Mother of 7 babies
 Goga Kapoor as Goga
 Amrish Puri as John D' Costa (Julie's father)
 Ballu Eagle as Allah Rakha

Shabbir Kumar was used for the first time to provide playback for Amitabh Bachchan.

Production
The script was written by Kader Khan, who also stars as the film's antagonist. In addition to having Bachchan play a Muslim protagonist, Khan incorporated elements of Islamic Sufi mysticism into the script, including various Sufi motifs and references.

Before the film started Bachchan asked Kannada legendary actor Rajkumar to make his cameo in the film. There was mutual respect between Amitabh and Rajkumar and they were both admirers of each other.

Accident
The film became famous even before its release when Amitabh Bachchan was critically injured on 26 July 1982 in the intestines while filming a fight scene with co-star Puneet Issar at the Bangalore University campus, which almost cost him his life.

In the fight scene, Bachchan was supposed to fall onto a table but miss-timed his jump. This resulted in an internal abdominal injury. He was transferred to a Mumbai hospital, where according to the actor, he went into a "haze and coma-like situation", and was "clinically dead for a couple of minutes".

While he was in the hospital, there were reports of widespread mourning, and prayers were offered by many Indians in the country and abroad. According to reports, Rajiv Gandhi canceled a trip to the United States to be with him.

Bachchan received 60 bottles of blood from 200 donors, one of whom was carrying the Hepatitis B virus. Bachchan recovered from the accident but discovered in 2000 that the virus had resulted in cirrhosis of the liver, which damaged about 75% of his liver. Bachchan later spoke out about his experience to raise awareness about the Hepatitis B vaccine.

Despite the critical injury, Bachchan recovered remarkably and resumed shooting on 7 January 1983. In the final cut of the film, the fight scene during which he got injured was frozen and a message appears marking the scene as the one in which he was injured. Manmohan Desai did this on Amitabh's wish.

Due to Bachchan's injury, the ending was also changed. The original script showed Amitabh dying after Kader Khan shot him. But later on, after the injury-and-recovery episode, Manmohan Desai, thinking that this would have a negative impact on the movie as well as a bad feeling in the audience, decided to change the ending. The modified ending has the hero recover after his operation.

Soundtrack
The music was by Laxmikant-Pyarelal and the lyrics were penned by Anand Bakshi. Manmohan Desai put Shabbir Kumar as a singer for multiple songs in the soundtrack due to the fact that his voice sounded like Mohammed Rafi's voice, who Manmohan admired as a singer.

Box office
It was declared "super-hit" by Boxoffice India in 2009. In 1984, it was estimated that the film had sold 70million tickets.

See also

Amar Akbar Anthony
Muqaddar Ka Sikander
Muslim social

References

External links
 

1983 films
1980s Hindi-language films
Films scored by Laxmikant–Pyarelal
Films directed by Manmohan Desai
Indian action comedy films
Films shot in Bangalore
1980s action comedy films